Faridpur Suhag , is a village and Union council in Depalpur Tehsil, Okara District, Punjab, of Pakistan. It is situated east of Haveli Lakha, Punjab, Pakistan

Union councils of Okara District
Villages in Okara District